Riders can refer to 

Leicester Riders, a British basketball team
Riders (Cooper novel), a book by Jilly Cooper
Riders (1993 film), a British film based on the book
Saskatchewan Roughriders, a Canadian football team
Steal (film), a 2002 American action film also called Riders
 "Riders", a group of police officers involved in misconduct in Oakland, California; see Allen v. City of Oakland

Gaming 
 Sonic Riders, a 2006 racing video game from the Sonic the Hedgehog series
 Sonic Riders: Zero Gravity, a 2008 racing video game from the Sonic the Hedgehog series
 Sonic Free Riders, a 2010 racing video game from the Sonic the Hedgehog series

See also 
 Rider (disambiguation)
 Ride (disambiguation)